In Greek mythology Agreus (Ancient Greek: Ἀγρεύς means 'hunter' or 'wild') or Argeus (Ἀργεύς) was the name of several characters:

 Agreus, one of the Pans, son of Hermes and Sose.
 Agreus, son of Apollo and Euboea, daughter of Macareus. He was the lord of Diphys in Euboea, or king of the entire island.
 Agreus, a warrior from Epidaurus, and one of the army of the Seven against Thebes.
 Agreus, a warrior from Calydon, also one of the army of the Seven against Thebes. He cut the right arm of Phegeus, the Theban.
 Agreus, a warrior from Pylos, yet another of the army of the Seven against Thebes. He was killed by Menoeceus, son of Creon.
Agreus, another name for Aristaeus, son of Apollo and Cyrene. Also called Nomios.

Notes

References 

Diodorus Siculus, The Library of History translated by Charles Henry Oldfather. Twelve volumes. Loeb Classical Library. Cambridge, Massachusetts: Harvard University Press; London: William Heinemann, Ltd. 1989. Vol. 3. Books 4.59–8. Online version at Bill Thayer's Web Site
Diodorus Siculus, Bibliotheca Historica. Vol 1-2. Immanel Bekker. Ludwig Dindorf. Friedrich Vogel. in aedibus B. G. Teubneri. Leipzig. 1888-1890. Greek text available at the Perseus Digital Library.
Gaius Julius Hyginus, Fabulae from The Myths of Hyginus translated and edited by Mary Grant. University of Kansas Publications in Humanistic Studies. Online version at the Topos Text Project.
Graves, Robert, The Greek Myths, Harmondsworth, London, England, Penguin Books, 1960. 
Graves, Robert, The Greek Myths: The Complete and Definitive Edition. Penguin Books Limited. 2017. 
 Publius Papinius Statius, The Thebaid translated by John Henry Mozley. Loeb Classical Library Volumes. Cambridge, MA, Harvard University Press; London, William Heinemann Ltd. 1928. Online version at the Topos Text Project.
 Publius Papinius Statius, The Thebaid. Vol I-II. John Henry Mozley. London: William Heinemann; New York: G.P. Putnam's Sons. 1928. Latin text available at the Perseus Digital Library.

Children of Apollo
Demigods in classical mythology
Characters in Seven against Thebes
Theban mythology